Hosa Digantha (Kannada:ಹೊಸ ದಿಗಂತ) is a Kannada morning daily in Karnataka. "Hosa Digantha" has the literal meaning of "New Horizon".

With its tag line Rāshtra Jāgrutiya Dainika (Kannada:ರಾಷ್ಚ್ರ ಜಾಗೃತಿಯ ದೈನಿಕ), meaning "Daily for national awareness", Hosa Digantha is a newspaper with nationalist ideology. Vinayak Bhat Muroor is the Editor-in-Chief of Hosa Digantha which also features young reporter Chiru Bhat who was earlier with Samaya TV and Vishwavani News. Another well-known columnist and author Rohith Chakrathirtha also writes to the newspaper.

Started in the year 1979, from Mangaluru, now has Mangaluru, Bengaluru, Shivamogga and Hubli editions. The Hubli edition was launched on 27 March 2011, by the Chief Minister of Karnataka Mr. Yeddyurappa.

See also
 List of Kannada-language newspapers
 List of Kannada-language magazines
 List of newspapers in India
 Media in Karnataka
 Media of India

References

External links 
 Official Website of Hosa Diganth

Newspapers published in Bangalore
Kannada-language newspapers
1979 establishments in Karnataka
Mass media in Mangalore
Newspapers established in 1979